Diego Antonio Bravo San Martín (born 22 November 1996) is a Chilean footballer who plays as left back for Deportes Iberia in the Segunda División Profesional de Chile.

Club career
Diego did all lower in Universidad Católica but his debut was in Unión La Calera.

External links

1996 births
Living people
People from Santiago
People from Santiago Province, Chile
People from Santiago Metropolitan Region
Chilean footballers
Chilean expatriate footballers
Association football defenders
Club Deportivo Universidad Católica footballers
Unión La Calera footballers
San Luis de Quillota footballers
Deportes Copiapó footballers
Rangers de Talca footballers
Club Celaya footballers
Deportes Iberia footballers
Chilean Primera División players
Primera B de Chile players
Liga de Expansión MX players
Segunda División Profesional de Chile players
Expatriate footballers in Mexico
Chilean expatriate sportspeople in Mexico
Chilean expatriates in Mexico
Footballers from Santiago